Elyasi-ye Ahmad (also Romanized as Elyāsī-ye Aḩmad) is a village in Posht Tang Rural District, in the Central District of Sarpol-e Zahab County, Kermanshah Province, Iran. At the 2006 census, its population was estimated to be 631 persons in 109 families.

References 

Populated places in Sarpol-e Zahab County